Geneviève Levy (born 24 February 1948 in Marseille) is French politician who was a member of the National Assembly of France as a member of the Republicans. She represented the 1st constituency of the Var department from 2002 until 2022.

References

1948 births
Living people
Politicians from Marseille
20th-century French Jews
Union for a Popular Movement politicians
The Republicans (France) politicians
The Social Right
Women members of the National Assembly (France)
Deputies of the 12th National Assembly of the French Fifth Republic
Deputies of the 13th National Assembly of the French Fifth Republic
Deputies of the 14th National Assembly of the French Fifth Republic
Deputies of the 15th National Assembly of the French Fifth Republic
21st-century French women politicians
Politicians from Toulon
Members of Parliament for Var